Helen Resor (born October 18, 1985) is an American ice hockey player. She won a bronze medal at the 2006 Winter Olympics. She graduated from Yale University in 2009. Helen Resor was the first Yale hockey player to compete in women’s ice hockey at the Olympics. Her sister, Jane, also played ice hockey for the Yale Bulldogs women's ice hockey program. Resor's brother-in-law is former NHL player Jeff Hamilton.

Playing career
As a youth player she began a bench-clearing brawl in a game in which she was the only female playing.  Resor played her high school hockey at Noble & Greenough Prep School in Massachusetts where she was coached by her uncle, Tom Resor.

Helen Resor was selected to play for Team USA in the 2006 Olympics. Resor was the first Bulldog to achieve that status, and when she won a bronze medal she became the first Yale hockey player of either gender to earn a medal since five Bulldog men won silver with Team USA in 1932.

Awards and honors
2004-05 All USCHO.com Rookie Team
2009 Third Team All-ECAC 
Finalist for the 2009 Patty Kazmaier Award

References

External links 
 Helen Resor's U.S. Olympic Team bio
 Helen Resor's Yale Team bio

1985 births
American women's ice hockey defensemen
Ice hockey players from Connecticut
Ice hockey players at the 2006 Winter Olympics
Living people
Medalists at the 2006 Winter Olympics
Olympic bronze medalists for the United States in ice hockey
Sportspeople from Greenwich, Connecticut
Yale Bulldogs women's ice hockey players
Noble and Greenough School alumni